In mathematics, and more specifically in abstract algebra, a pseudo-ring is one of the following variants of a ring:

 A rng, i.e., a structure satisfying all the axioms of a ring except for the existence of a multiplicative identity.
 An abelian group  equipped with a subgroup B and a multiplication  making B a ring and A a B-module.

None of these definitions are equivalent, so it is best to avoid the term "pseudo-ring" or to clarify which meaning is intended.

See also 
 Semiring – an algebraic structure similar to a ring, but without the requirement that each element must have an additive inverse

References 

Ring theory
Algebraic structures
Algebras